Wakefieldia is a genus of two species of fungi, generally thought to belong in the family Boletaceae, but recent molecular study has shown that Wakefieldia macrospora is in fact not related to Boletales and belongs to family Hymenogastraceae.

References

Boletaceae
Boletales genera
Taxa named by E. J. H. Corner

nl:Veloporphyrellus